Czechoslovakia competed at the 1980 Summer Olympics in Moscow, USSR. 209 competitors, 162 men and 47 women, took part in 114 events in 21 sports.

Medalists

Archery

In its first appearance in the Olympic archery competition, Czechoslovakia sent two women and one man. Zdeňka Padevětová earned a fourth-place finish.

Women's Individual Competition:
Zdeňka Padevětová — 2405 points (→ 4th place)
Jitka Dolejší — 2219 points (→ 20th place)

Men's Individual Competition:
František Hadaš — 2305 points (→ 24th place)

Athletics

Men's 1,500 metres
Jozef Plachý
 Heat — 3:44.4 
 Semifinals — 3:40.4
 Final — 3:40.7 (→ 6th place)

Men's 5,000 metres
 Jiří Sýkora
 Heat — 13:43.1
 Semi Final — 13:31.0
 Final — 13:25.0 (→ 9th place)

Men's 10,000 metres
 Jiří Sýkora
 Heat — 29:19.8 (→ did not advance)

Men's Marathon
 Vlastimil Zwiefelhofer
 Final — did not finish (→ no ranking)
 Josef Janska
 Final — did not finish (→ no ranking)

Men's 4 × 400 metres Relay
 Josef Lomický, Dušan Malovec, František Břečka, and Karel Kolář
 Heat — 3:03.5
 Final — 3:07.0 (→ 7th place)

Men's 110 m Hurdles
 Július Ivan
 Final — did not finish (→ no ranking)

Men's 3,000 m Steeplechase
 Dušan Moravčík
 Heat — 8:33.4 
 Semifinals — 8:28.0
 Final — 8:29.1 (→ 10th place)

Men's Long Jump
 Jan Leitner
 Qualification — 7.68 m (→ did not advance)

Men's Discus Throw
 Imrich Bugár
 Qualification — 65.08 m
 Final — 66.38 m (→  Silver Medal)

Men's Hammer Throw
Jiří Chamrád
 Qualification — 69.38 m
 Final Round — 68.16 m (→ 12th place)

Men's Shot Put
Jaromír Vlk
 Qualification — 19.69 m
 Final — 20.24 m (→ 7th place)

Men's 20 km Walk
Pavol Blažek
 Final — 1:35:30.8 (→ 14th place)
Jozef Pribilinec
 Final — 1:42:52.4 (→ 20th place)
Juraj Benčík
 Final — DSQ (→ no ranking)

Men's 50 km Walk
Pavol Blažek
 Final — 4:16:26 (→ 10th place)
Juraj Benčík
 Final — 4:27:39 (→ 13th place)
Jaromír Vaňous
 Final — DSQ (→ no ranking)

Women's Long Jump
 Jarmila Nygrýnová
 Qualification — 6.58 m
 Final — 6.83 m (→ 6th place)

Women's Discus Throw
 Zdena Bartoňová
 Qualification — 59.48 m
 Final — 57.78 m (→ 11th place)

Women's Shot Put
 Zdena Bartoňová
 Final — 18.40 m (→ 10th place)

Women's Pentathlon
 Marcela Koblasová — 4328 points (→ 11th place)
 100 metres — 14.10s
 Shot Put — 13.42m 
 High Jump — 1.71m 
 Long Jump — 6.15m 
 800 metres — 2:20.30

Basketball

Men's team competition
Preliminary round (group A)
 Lost to Brazil (70-72)
 Defeated India (133-65)
 Lost to Soviet Union (83-99)
Second Round (Group B)
 Lost to Australia (86-91)
 Defeated Sweden (83-61)
 Lost to Poland (84-88)
 Defeated Senegal (88-72) → 9th place
Team Roster:
 Jaroslav Skála
 Dušan Žáček
 Vlastimil Havlík
 Peter Rajniak
 Stanislav Kropilák
 Pavol Bojanovský
 Zdeněk Kos
 Jiří Pospíšil
 Vlastibor Klimeš
 Kamil Brabenec
 Zdeněk Douša
 Gustáv Hraška

Boxing

Men's Featherweight (57 kg)
Miroslav Šándor
 First Round — Bye
 Second Round — Lost to Dejan Marovic (Yugoslavia) on points (0-5)

Canoeing

Cycling

Eleven cyclists represented Czechoslovakia in 1980.

Individual road race
 Jiří Škoda
 Vlastibor Konečný
 Ladislav Ferebauer
 Michal Klasa

Team time trial
 Michal Klasa
 Vlastibor Konečný
 Alipi Kostadinov
 Jiří Škoda

Sprint
 Anton Tkáč

1000m time trial
 Petr Kocek

Individual pursuit
 Martin Penc

Team pursuit
 Teodor Černý
 Martin Penc
 Jiří Pokorný
 Igor Sláma

Diving

Fencing

Seven fencers, six men and one woman, represented Czechoslovakia in 1980.

Men's foil
 Jaroslav Jurka
 František Koukal

Men's épée
 Jaroslav Jurka
 Oldřich Kubišta
 Jiří Douba

Men's team épée
 Jaroslav Jurka, Jaromír Holub, Jiří Douba, Jiří Adam, Oldřich Kubišta

Women's foil
 Katarína Lokšová-Ráczová

Football

Men's team competition

Preliminary Round (Group B) 
All matches were played at the Kirov Stadium in Leningrad except where noted.
 July 21, 1980 : Czechoslovakia - Colombia 3-0 (2-0) 
 July 23, 1980 : Czechoslovakia - Nigeria 1-1 (1-0) 
 July 25, 1980 : Czechoslovakia - Kuwait 0-0 (0-0)

Final standings 

With four points each (one win and two draws), Czechoslovakia and Kuwait qualified for the quarterfinals.

Quarterfinals 
 July 27, 1980 : Czechoslovakia - Cuba 4-0 (4-0)

Semifinals 
 July 29, 1980 : Czechoslovakia - Yugoslavia 2-0 (2-0) at Dynamo Stadium, Moscow

Final 
 August 2, 1980 : Czechoslovakia - East Germany 1-0 (0-0) Loujniki Stadium, Moscow

Roster 
 Stanislav Seman
 Luděk Macela
 Josef Mazura
 Libor Radimec
 Zdeněk Rygel
 Petr Němec
 Ladislav Vízek
 Jan Berger
 Jindřich Svoboda
 Luboš Pokluda
 Werner Lička
 Rostislav Václavíček
 Jaroslav Netolička
 Oldřich Rott
 František Štambachr
 František Kunzo

Gymnastics

Handball

Women's Tournament
Jana Kuťková

Hockey

Women's team competition
Preliminary Round Robin
 Lost to Soviet Union (0-2)
 Drew with Zimbabwe (2-2)
 Defeated India (2-1)
 Defeated Austria (5-0) 
 Defeated Poland (1-0) →  Silver Medal
Team Roster:
 Jarmila Králíčková
 Berta Hrubá
 Iveta Šranková
 Lenka Vymazalová
 Jiřina Křížová
 Jiřina Kadlecová
 Jiřina Čermáková
 Marta Urbanová
 Květa Petříčková
 Marie Sýkorová
 Ida Hubáčková
 Milada Blažková
 Jana Lahodová
 Alena Kyselicová
 Jiřina Hájková
 Viera Podhányiová

Judo

Modern pentathlon

Three male pentathletes represented Czechoslovakia in 1980.

Men's Individual Competition:
Milan Kadlec — 5229 pts, 8th place 
Jan Bártů — 5158 pts, 16th place
Bohumil Starnovský — 4952 pts, 26th place 

Men's Team Competition:
Kadlec, Bártů, and Starnovský — 15339 pts, 6th place

Rowing

Sailing

Shooting

Swimming

Men's 200m Freestyle
Petr Adamec
 Final — 1:55.84 (→ did not advance)
Radek Havel
 Final — 1:55.07 (→ did not advance)

Men's 400m Freestyle
Daniel Machek
 Final — 3:55.66 (→ 5th place)

Men's 100m Backstroke
Miloslav Rolko
 Final — 57.74 (→ 4th place)

Men's 400m Individual Medley
Miloslav Rolko
 Final — 4:26.99 (→ 6th place)
Daniel Machek
 Final — 4:29.86 (→ 8th place)

Women's 100m Breaststroke
 Irena Fleissnerová
 Heats — 1:13.35 (→ did not advance)

Women's 200m Breaststroke
Irena Fleissnerová
 Final — 2:33.23 (→ 5th place)

Volleyball

Men's team competition
Preliminary round (group A)
 Lost to Soviet Union (1-3)
 Lost to Italy (2-3)
 Lost to Bulgaria (0-3)
 Defeated Cuba (3-2)
Classification Matches
 5th/8th place: Lost to Brazil (0-3)
 7th/8th place: Lost to Cuba (1-3) → 8th place
Team Roster
 Dušan Prieložný
 Pavel Valach
 Vlado Sirvoň
 Ján Repák
 Josef Novotný
 Jaroslav Šmid
 Vlastimil Lenert
 Jaroslav Kopet
 Ján Cifra
 Pavel Řeřábek
 Josef Pick
 Cyril Krejčí
Head coaches: Pavel Schenk and Zdeněk Václavík

Weightlifting

Wrestling

References

Nations at the 1980 Summer Olympics
1980 Summer Olympics
Summer Olympics